
Gmina Dobra is a rural gmina (administrative district) in Limanowa County, Lesser Poland Voivodeship, in southern Poland.

Villages
Gmina Dobra contains the villages and settlements of Chyszówki, Dobra, Gruszowiec, Jurków, Półrzeczki, Porąbka, Przenosza, Skrzydlna, Stróża, Wilczyce and Wola Skrzydlańska.

Neighbouring gminas
Gmina Dobra is bordered by the gminas of Jodłownik, Kamienica, Mszana Dolna, Słopnice, Tymbark and Wiśniowa.

References
Gminy Dobra
Polish official population figures 2006

Dobra
Gmina Dobra